Royal Air Force Babdown Farm or more simply RAF Babdown Farm is a former Royal Air Force relief landing ground located  west of Tetbury, Gloucestershire, and  south of Stroud, Gloucestershire, England. It was open between 1940 and 1948 as a relief landing ground used by training units before being used by maintenance units for storage. Part of the site has since been converted into an industrial estate, while the rest is used for agriculture.

History
Babdown was built in 1940 as a relief landing ground (RLG) with two grass runways and a flare path for No. 9 Service Flying Training School initially flying Hawker Audaxes before changing to Miles Masters and Hawker Hurricanes. The airfield was bombed in 1940 and 1941 but no serious damage was caused. In 1942 the base was redeveloped to full RLG standard through the addition of three Sommerfeld Tracking runways and blister hangars with associated perimeter track and additional buildings.

It was occupied by No. 15 (Pilots) Advanced Flying Unit RAF from early 1944 until June 1945 and No. 1532 (Beam Approach Training) Flight RAF. The last aircraft left during June 1945. It was used until 1948 by No. 7 Maintenance Unit RAF storing and repairing Airspeed Oxfords. As with the majority of airfields hosting training units there were a number of serious and fatal accidents due to pilot error and ageing machines which had been repeatedly used by inexperienced crews.

The following units were posted here at some point: 
 No. 3 Flying Instructors School (Advanced) RAF with Airspeed Oxfords and Miles Masters from 1942 until early 1944
 No. 3 (Pilots) Advanced Flying Unit RAF
 No. 9 (Pilots) Advanced Flying Unit RAF
 No. 251 Maintenance Unit RAF

At its peak there were 571 RAF personnel and 223 Women's Auxiliary Air Force (WAAF) personnel based at Babdown.

Current use
The site is now partially occupied by an industrial estate known as "Babdown Airfield" and the remainder has been returned to agriculture.

References

Citations

Bibliography

Royal Air Force stations in Gloucestershire